Forbidden Paradise 4: High as a Kite is the fourth album in the Forbidden Paradise series. It is the second album in the series to be mixed by well-known trance DJ/producer Tiësto. As with the rest of the Forbidden Paradise series, the album is a live turntable mix.

Track listing
 Plankton - "Sunrise Acid" – 4:55
 Endlos - "Endlos" – 3:02
 Blue Minds - "Troubleshooter" – 2:34
 Groove Park - "Hit The Bang" – 4:40
 Quench - "Dreams" – 3:37
 Nail - "I Am Them" [Accelerator Remix] – 5:01
 Emmanuel Top - "Tone" – 4:13
 Axial Force - "Structures" – 1:25
 Razors Edge - "Tribal Sunrise" [Dancefloor NRG Mix] – 6:04
 Humate - "3.1" – 5:10
 Bassline Baby - "Silverfish" – 3:42
 Toja - "The Home Of The Big Beat" – 3:28
 Dr. Fernando - "High Pressure" – 2:54
 Cortex Thrill - "Euphoria" – 5:01
 Aura - "Planet-S" – 2:25
 Fast Trac - "Inertia" – 3:58
 Blue Ocean - "Brightness" – 4:13

Tiësto compilation albums
1995 compilation albums